Nicola de Marco (born August 28, 1990 in Pordenone) is an Italian racing driver.

Career

Formula Azzurra
After a six-year karting career, de Marco moved up to the Formula Azzurra championship with the Durango team in 2006, and was mightily impressive in his one and only Azzurra campaign. Nicola won three races en route to third in the championship, finishing behind Giuseppe Termine and fellow FIA Formula Two Championship racer Mirko Bortolotti.

He also competed in the Formula Renault 2.0 Italia Winter Series, finishing joint ninth in the championship with Daniel Zampieri.

Formula Three
After only one year at a junior single-seater level, de Marco moved up to the Italian Formula Three Championship with Lucidi Motors, and finished the 2007 season with six podiums and a pole position at Vallelunga. He ended up sixth in the championship, but was outperformed by team-mate Paolo Maria Nocera, who would go on to lift the title.

A change to the Spanish Formula Three Championship for 2008 was hoped to see de Marco progress and earn more experience. Driving for the RP Motorsport team, de Marco won races at Spa and Albacete on his way to fourth in the championship, losing out on third to fellow F2 racer Natacha Gachnang by a solitary point.

Formula Two
Nicola drove in the relaunched FIA Formula Two Championship in 2009, driving car number 10 in the series. He finished in tenth position, with his best result coming in the final race at Circuit de Catalunya, where he finished second to Andy Soucek. He once again competed in the series in 2010, finishing 8th.

Racing record

Career summary

Complete FIA Formula Two Championship results
(key) (Races in bold indicate pole position) (Races in italics indicate fastest lap)

References

External links
Nicola de Marco career details at driverdb.com

1990 births
Living people
People from Pordenone
Italian racing drivers
Formula Azzurra drivers
Italian Formula Renault 2.0 drivers
Italian Formula Three Championship drivers
Euroformula Open Championship drivers
FIA Formula Two Championship drivers
International GT Open drivers
Sportspeople from Friuli-Venezia Giulia
Team Lazarus drivers
RP Motorsport drivers
RC Motorsport drivers
Durango drivers